Park Chan-yong (born January 27, 1996) is a South Korean football player. He plays for Pohang Steelers.

Club statistics
Updated to 23 February 2018.

References

External links

Profile at Renofa Yamaguchi
Profile at Kamatamare Sanuki

1996 births
Living people
South Korean footballers
J2 League players
Ehime FC players
Renofa Yamaguchi FC players
Kamatamare Sanuki players
Association football defenders